The Cheltenham Covered Court Championships  also called the Cheltenham Covered Courts was a men's and women's indoor wood court tennis tournament staged from the 19th to 23 April 1881 only at the Imperial Winter Gardens, Cheltenham, Gloucestershire, England. It was one of the earliest locations in England to stage an indoor wood court tennis event.

History

The Cheltenham Covered Court Championships was an early Victorian era men's and women's indoor wood court tennis tournament staged from the 19th to 23 April 1881 only at the Imperial Winter Gardens, Cheltenham, Gloucestershire, England. Cheltenham was first towns in England to have a covered court.

Description of event
A description of the event that concluded on 23 April 1881 .

Description of venue
A description of the venue.

Finals

Mens Singles

Women's Singles

Mens Doubles

Women's Doubles

Mix Doubles

References

Sources
 Baltzell, E. Digby (2013). Sporting Gentlemen: Men's Tennis from the Age of Honor to the Cult of the Superstar. Piscataway, New Jersey, United States: Transaction Publishers. ISBN 978-1-4128-5180-0.
 Nieuwland, Alex. "Tournament – Cheltenham Covered Courts". www.tennisarchives.com. Netherlands: Tennis Archives.
 Routledge's Sporting Annual (1882). George Routledge and Sons. London. 
 Tingay, Lance (1977). 100 Years of Wimbledon. London: Guinness Superlatives Ltd. ISBN 978-0-900424-71-7.
 Site of the Winter Gardens - Historic Public Gardens of Cheltenham - PocketSights". pocketsights.com. PocketSights, LLC. 2021.

Defunct tennis tournaments in the United Kingdom
Indoor tennis tournaments
Tennis tournaments in England
Wood court tennis tournaments